Salvijus "Sal" Bercys (born 8 September 1989 in Lithuania) is an American International Master. His peak FIDE rating is 2512. He is a major figure in Michael Weinreb's book The Kings of New York and was part of the "dream team" from the Edward R. Murrow school, along with Alex Lenderman (now a grandmaster).

References

External links
 
 
 130 Games at New In Chess
 USCF tournament history 

1989 births
American chess players
Chess International Masters
Living people
Edward R. Murrow High School alumni